Wilhelm Graf von Hohenau (27 November 1884, Berlin – 11 April 1957, Hamburg) was a German Graf and horse rider who competed in the 1912 Summer Olympics.

Early life
He was the second son of Count Frederick of Hohenau and his wife, Charlotte von der Decken (1863-1933). Paternally, he was a grandson of Prince Albrecht of Prussia and his morganatic second wife Rosalie von Rauch. This relation made him second cousin of Emperor Wilhelm II.

Equestrian
He won the bronze medal in the equestrian team jumping event. Furthermore, between 1920 and 1933, he won 227 tournaments throughout Europe.

Personal life
On 20 May 1916 he married firstly Countess Anna Wanda Sara Ellinor Henckel von Donnersmarck (1894-1946), daughter of Count Hugo III Henckel von Donnersmarck (1857-1923) and Anna von von Fabrice (1854-1905). They had on daughter and one son:
Countess Charlotte Elisabeth Hedwig Wilhelmine Rosalie Sara Anna Lori von Hohenau (b.1917)
Count Albrecht Wilhelm Friedrich Carl Hugo Eberhard Max von Hohenau (b.1919)

After divorcing his first wife, he married secondly Ellen Retemeyer-Ketschendorf (b. 1898) on 24 Mar 1932. She was also previously married to sculptor Kurt Conrad Karl Edzard (1890-1972).

Ancestry

External links

External links
 profile

1884 births
1957 deaths
Sportspeople from Berlin
German royalty
German male equestrians
Equestrians at the 1912 Summer Olympics
Olympic equestrians of Germany
Olympic bronze medalists for Germany
German show jumping riders
Olympic medalists in equestrian
Medalists at the 1912 Summer Olympics